BSK Defense was the successor of Velos O.E., a company established in 1982, producing a series of aerial target and aerial observation products used by foreign companies and armed forces. The current company was founded in Chania, Crete, in 2008. It focused on design, development and production of defense systems, including UAVs (Phaeton, Ideon, Kyon, Erevos), USVs (Seirios 65 and 95), target drones (Nemesis, (H)Yperion, Panas), electronics, and UAV engines. 

In 2010, it started development of a cruise missile type HSC-1 Makedon in cooperation with other Greek companies, including Axon Engineering (which undertook parts of the engine development). The project was eventually cancelled, due to Greece's drastically reduced defense budgets. 
The company was also involved in engine development, including the VRJ-230A jet engine, employed in its Nemesis B Target system. 

BSK Defense went out of business in 2018.

External links 
 Company website
 L.S. Skartsis, "Greek Vehicle & Machine Manufacturers 1800 to present: A Pictorial History", Marathon (2012)  (eBook)
 BSK Defense in Greek Defense Companies index
 Report about BSK Defense in PTISI magazine
 BSK Defense Makedon project
 BSK Defense Makedon project (STRATIGIKI magazine)
 Nemesis B Target System

Aircraft manufacturers of Greece
Defence companies of Greece